Oulad Bourima is a commune in Guercif Province of the Oriental administrative region of Morocco. At the time of the 2004 census, the commune had a total population of 1951 people living in 318 households. The 2014 Moroccan census recorded a population of 1486 living in 296 households.

References

Populated places in Guercif Province
Rural communes of Oriental (Morocco)